The 1982 Mid-American Conference men's basketball tournament was held March 1-3 at Crisler Arena in Ann Arbor, Michigan.   defeated  in the championship game by  the score of 79–75 to win their first MAC men's basketball tournament and a bid to the NCAA tournament. There they lost to Kansas State in the first round.  Allen Rayhorn of Northern Illinois was named the tournament MVP.

Format
Seven of the ten MAC teams participated.  First Round games were played in the home arena of the higher seeded team. The semi-finals and final were played at Crisler Arena in Ann Arbor, Michigan.

Bracket

References

Mid-American Conference men's basketball tournament
Tournament
MAC men's basketball tournament
MAC men's basketball tournament
Sports in Ann Arbor, Michigan